Petr Svoboda (born 10 October 1984 in Třebíč, Czechoslovakia) is a Czech track and field athlete, competing in the sprint hurdles. He currently holds national records in both 110 metres hurdles (13.27, 2010) and 60 metres hurdles (7.44, 2010). On 6 March he won a bronze medal at the 2009 European Indoor Championships in Torino.

Biography
After breaking the national record for the 110m hurdles, he went to the 2010 European Athletics Championships in Barcelona later that year as one of the favourites. However, the gold went to Andy Turner as Svoboda, having led with 30 metres to go, collided badly with a hurdle, and went on to finish in a disappointing 6th place.
On 4 March 2011, Svoboda won the gold medal in the 60m hurdles at the 2011 European Athletics Indoor Championships. Although Turner decided against competing, Svoboda beat Frenchman Garfield Darien who has to settle for a second silver to match the one he won in Barcelona.

On 21 September 2012 he married the pole vaulter Jiřina Ptáčníková, however the couple divorced in 2014.

In 2011, Svoboda suffered a heel injury, which interrupted his career for next three years. In May 2014, he announced return to professional athletics.

Achievements

References

External links
 
 
 Athlete's profile

1984 births
Living people
Czech male hurdlers
Athletes (track and field) at the 2008 Summer Olympics
Athletes (track and field) at the 2016 Summer Olympics
Olympic athletes of the Czech Republic
World Athletics Championships athletes for the Czech Republic
Sportspeople from Třebíč